William John Denbigh Down (born 15 July 1934) was the ninth Bishop of Bermuda and later the Assistant Bishop of Leicester.

Educated at St John's College, Cambridge (he proceeded Cambridge Master of Arts {MA(Cantab)}), Down was ordained in 1960. His first post was as a curate at St Paul's Church, Salisbury after which he was secretary to the Missions to Seaman and chaplain of St Michael Paternoster Royal until his ordination to the episcopate in 1990. He returned to England as the Assistant Bishop of Leicester before retiring in 2001.

References

1934 births
Alumni of St John's College, Cambridge
20th-century Anglican bishops in Bermuda
Anglican bishops of Bermuda
Assistant bishops of Leicester (1987–2017)
Living people